Periploca may refer to two different genera:

Periploca (moth), in the family Cosmopterigidae
Periploca (plant), in the family Apocynaceae